Agustín Argote (11 March 1926 – 5 August 1996) was a Spanish boxer. He competed in the men's lightweight event at the 1948 Summer Olympics. At the 1948 Summer Olympics, he lost to Raúl Zumbano of Brazil by a second-round knockout in the tournament's Round of 32.

References

External links
 

1926 births
1996 deaths
Spanish male boxers
Olympic boxers of Spain
Boxers at the 1948 Summer Olympics
Sportspeople from Navarre
Lightweight boxers